is a Japanese television series, a Tokusatsu drama of the 38th installment in Toei Company's Super Sentai metaseries, following Zyuden Sentai Kyoryuger. It premiered on TV Asahi affiliates on February 16, 2014, joining Kamen Rider Gaim and later, Kamen Rider Drive in the Super Hero Time programming block, and it ended on February 15, 2015. The series has a train motif, and unlike many previous series where the heroes are named after colors, the heroes in ToQger are numbered and also regularly swap colors during battle.

ToQger began airing in South Korea as Power Rangers Train Force.

Two of the series' villain costumes and a prop were used for the 24th, 25th and 29th seasons of the American Power Rangers series (Power Rangers Ninja Steel and Power Rangers Super Ninja Steel, both adapting the 2015 Sentai installment, Shuriken Sentai Ninninger and the second season of Power Rangers Dino Fury, which is adapting the 2019 Sentai installment,  Kishiryu Sentai Ryusoulger). Otherwise, ToQger was the second Sentai series since Chōjin Sentai Jetman to be skipped over for adaptation into a season of Power Rangers (2012's Tokumei Sentai Go-Busters, which was later adapted into Power Rangers Beast Morphers in 2019, being the first).

The series' main characters made a cameo appearance in the film Zyuden Sentai Kyoryuger vs. Go-Busters: The Great Dinosaur Battle! Farewell Our Eternal Friends, and appeared in a special meet-and-greet and press conference at Tokyo Dome City in late January 2014. In October 2014, the series was given the Japan Railway Award's Special award by the Ministry of Land, Infrastructure, Transport and Tourism in its annual "Train Day" observance, recognizing its effect on making children enjoy trains.

Story

The five ToQgers are also childhood friends who are fighting to recover the memories of their hometown after it was consumed by the Shadow Line's evil. Later joined by Akira Nijino, a former Shadow Creep who reformed, the ToQgers begin a campaign to free these "Shadow Towns" from their Shadow Creep Keepers in an attempt to recover their memories while the Shadow Line itself must deal with some opposition among their own subjects.

Episodes

As the motif for ToQger is trains, the episodes are called .

Production
The trademark for the series was filed by Toei Company on August 30, 2013.

Films
The ToQgers made their debut appearance in the post-credits scene of Zyuden Sentai Kyoryuger vs. Go-Busters: The Great Dinosaur Battle! Farewell Our Eternal Friends.

Kamen Rider Taisen

It also features the return of characters from previous Kamen Rider Series, most notably Hiroshi Fujioka of the original Kamen Rider. The event of the movie takes place between Station 6 and 7.

Galaxy Line S.O.S.

 was released in Japanese theaters on July 19, 2014, double-billed with the film for Kamen Rider Gaim. The event of the movie takes place between Station 20 and 21.

ToQger vs. Kyoryuger

 is the VS team-up movie between Ressha Sentai ToQger and Zyuden Sentai Kyoryuger. The film premiered in Japanese theaters on January 17, 2015. The event of the movie takes place between Station 35 and 36.

Ninninger vs. ToQger

 was released in Japanese theaters on January 23, 2016, featuring the casts of both Shuriken Sentai Ninninger and ToQger.

Special DVD
 is a special DVD by Kodansha that details Ticket ending up on Akira's hand. After attempts to get him off, Akira and Light are forced to help Ticket in settling things with his nemesis Kaniros, who also enlisted General Schwarz's assistance. The event of the specials takes place between Station 26 and 27.

V-Cinema
 is a direct-to-video film to be released on June 24, 2015. Ten years after the events of the series, the fully grown up ToQgers find themselves being attacked by the Shadow Line before ending up sent back through time to the year 2017 on the day before their graduation when their childhood selves set out to find Akira. But the childhood ToQgers find themselves meeting the mysterious  while facing the Shadow Line's new leader Archduke Hei, who attempts to turn Akira back to Zalam with help from the 6th ToQger's silent partner Tanktop Shadow. But the ToQgers, regaining their lost Imagination in the process, help their childhood selves save Akira and redeem Tanktop Shadow with Hei going into hiding to have his revenge on the powerless ToQgers in eight years' time. Luckily, the time paradox caused by Glitta allowed the ToQgers to retain their regained Imagination while they are joined by Akira, the childhood ToQgers and Conductor as ToQ 7gou in finishing Hei for good. The event of the movie takes place after the final episode of the series.

Cast
: , 
: , 
: , 
: , 
: , 
: 
: 
: 
, ToQger Equipment Voice: 
: 
: Narration:
: 
: 
: 
: 
/: .

Guest stars

: 
: 
: 
: 
: 
: 
: 
: 
: 
: 
: 
: 

Vocal: 
Guitar: AYANO (of FULL AHEAD)
Bass: 
Drums: 
:

Theme songs
Opening theme

Lyrics: 
Composition & Arrangement: 
Artist: 
Ending theme

Lyrics: Shoko Fujibayashi
Composition: 
Arrangement: Go Sakabe
Artist: Project.R (YOFFY, Takayoshi Tanimoto, Shogo Kamada)

Notes

References

External links
 at TV Asahi
 at Toei Company
 at Super-Sentai.net

Super Sentai
2014 Japanese television series debuts
2015 Japanese television series endings
Japanese comedy television series
Railway culture in Japan
Television shows written by Yasuko Kobayashi
Trains in fiction